Alick Macheso (born 10 June 1968), is a Zimbabwean musician. He came onto the music scene as a solo artist in 1998, with his debut album Magariro, which carried "Pakutema	
Munda ", probably the least noticeable from that album. From the first album he received recognition from fans, he did the album Vakiridzo the following year. His third album was Simbaradzo which made waves across Zimbabwe.

Simbaradzo was and still is the best selling album of all time in Zimbabwe with hits like Mundikumbuke and Amai VaRubhi. He was to follow on the success of Simbaradzo with Zvakanaka Zvakadaro. He can dance, sing and play the guitar - a rare combination of skills among musicians. Zvakanaka Zvakadaro was followed, in 2003, by Zvido Zvenyu Kunyanya. In 2011 he initiated the popular Zora Butter dance which has come to be known as Macheso's initiative.

Macheso was born in 1968 in Shamva, 90 kilometres to the north of Harare, to parents of Malawian origin - a fact that was to inspire him to be able to speak and sing in five languages - Shona, Chichewa, Sena, Venda and Lingala. Growing on a farm, especially before Zimbabwe 's Independence from Britain in 1980, the environment did not offer him many opportunities. In 1983, at the youthful age of 15, he left the farm compounds of Shamva and headed for Harare.

Arriving in the capital at the invitation of a relative, who had been inspired by Macheso's guitar-playing prowess at the farm compounds, the two went on a music-inspired journey, joining several bands, mostly sungura-playing outfits.

In 1997, he broke ranks with the Khiama Boys fronted by Nicholas Zakaria, to form his own Orchestra Mberikwazvo.

He is well known throughout Southern Africa as one of the most successful singers and ranked among the best bass guitarists on the continent. He is Zimbabwe's best-ever selling artiste with his album Simbaradzo being the highest ever sold album in Zimbabwe. Macheso is arguably the best sungura artist to ever emerge from Zimbabwe. In recent years Macheso has risen to become an advertising face for many corporations that include the country's leading bakery Bakers Inn, paint company Nash Paints and humanitarian organisation Red Cross. Macheso's recent achievement was his appointment as ambassador for housing company, which deals with Enhanced Mortgaging and Housing, which targets low-income earners and self-employed clients. Macheso has also used his role to assist fellow artists acquire residential stands at affordable rates.
 
He has ventured into charity and humanitarian work, for instance in May 2019, he started building two classroom blocks at his former primary school in Shamva; Enterprise Primary School. He also offered to pay school fees for 105 less privileged pupils at the same school.

On December 4th, 2020, Alick Macheso released the single "Zuro Ndizuro",

On June 10th, 2022 he released his 12th Album Tasvitswa Nashe.

Personal life

Alick MAcheso is married to Nyadzisai Macheso who is also popularly known as Mai Sharo. He described his wife as the pillar of strength at her birthday party in March 2021 when she  turned 50. He has five children with his first wife, Nyadzisai Macheso, and two kids with his second wife, Tafadzwa Mapako. Macheso divorced Tafadzwa in 2014. Tafadzwa's marriage to the musician was her third failed marriage. She demanded $7,130 monthly to cater for her children, Maneesha and Alick Junior, but the court sliced the divorce settlement to $1,030 per month. In 2013, Tafi Phiri from Chipinge claimed to be the artist's father but never did a DNA test. Moreover, he left Chipinge after his marriage collapsed.

Awards and Charity work

The celebrity's humanitarian character is praiseworthy because he built two classrooms and sponsored 105 students at his former primary school. Red Cross made him its Zimbabwe Ambassador in 2013 because his annual Chitungwiza General Hospital Charity show helped many sick people. He has won the Best Song of the Year Best Live Performer (ZIMA) award, Best Sungura Artiste (ZIMA) award. He was also honored by Nash Paints and given an award in recognition of his work, talent and contribution to the music industry. Macheso worked with Nash Paints since its inception, he has been their brand ambassador and is part of the story of Nash Paints. Alick Macheso is an ethical artist, unlike many musicians today who tarnish each other's name for fame. In June 2019, the musician pledged to pay school fees for 109 pupils who are not covered under the government’s Basic Education Assistance Module (BEAM). He also pledged that he would build a new academic block for the ECD learners.

Discography

Magariro (1998)
Vakiridzo (1999)
Simbaradzo (2000)
Zvakanaka Zvakadaro (2001)
Zvido Zvenyu Kunyanya (2003)
Vapupuri Pupurai (2005)
Ndezvashe-Eh (2007).
Zvinoda kutendwa (2010).
Kwatakabva Mitunhu (2012).
Tsoka Dzerwendo (2016).
Dzinosvitsa Kure (2018).
Zuro Ndizuro -Single (2020).
Tinosvitswa Nashee (2022).

Album Tracks
Magariro (1998)
1.Pakutema Munda

2.Baba Namai

3.Gogogoi

4.Sarah

5.Kushungurudzwa

6.Mwana wamai vangu

Vakiridzo (1999)
1.Tariro

2.Kumuzi Kwatu

3.Shedia

4.Yave Tinotenda

5.Chitubu

6.Raramiro

Simbaradzo (2000)
1.Amai Varubhi

2.Kunyarara Zvavo

3.Nguva

4.Kusekana kwaana kamba

5.Mundikumbe

6.Petunia

Zvakanaka Zvakadaro (2001) 
1.Monalisa

2.Chisoni

3.Kumhanya Kuripo

4.Chara Chimwe

5.Mwari Wenyasha

6.Zvimiro

Zvido Zvenyu Kunyanya (2003)
1.Madhawu

2.Wemakonzo

3.Kukwereketa

4.Parudo

5.Ziva Zvaunoda

6.Charakupa

Vapupuri Pupurai (2005)
1.Makandidana

2.Upenyu Hwemunhu

3.1940

4.Teererai

5.Baba Vasandy

6.Amakebhoyi

7.Murondatsimba

Ndezvashe-Eh (2007)
1.Madhuwe

2.Chikopokopo

3.Amuna Wangu

4.Chengetai

5.Murume

6.Ndiwe

Zvinoda Kutendwa (2010)
1.Tafadzwa

2.Nguva Yekutenda

3.Zvinoda Kutendwa

4.Chimoko

5.Kudzima Moto

6.Chaungada Chose

Kwatakabva Mitunhu (Kure KweKure) (2012)
1.Chirimumawoko

2.Samasimba

3.Macharangwanda

4.Kutsvaga Chiremba

5.Zvipo

6.Cynthia

Tsoka Dzerwendo (Aaayaya) (2016)
1.Baba

2.Kurarama Inyasha

3.Wandirangaridza

4.Munyaradzi

5.Gungwa

6.Mude Mude

Dzinosvitsa Kure (2018)
1.Chikuru Kurarama

2.Pfuma Yacho

3.Ndakakutadzirei

4.Kudzwai

5.Madzitete

6.Vane Zvavanoda

Single Zuro NdiZuro 2020

References

Zimbabwean musicians
1968 births
Living people
People from Mashonaland Central Province